Desert Desperadoes is a 1959 American/Italian Biblical drama film directed by Steve Sekely from an original screenplay by Victor Stoloff and Robert Hill. Co-produced by the Italian company Venturini Express and the American studio Nasht Productions, it was distributed by RKO Radio Pictures through the States Rights Independent Exchanges and released on July 16, 1959. The film stars Ruth Roman and Akim Tamiroff.

Plot
A merchant's caravan led by Verrus, a former Roman soldier, comes across a beautiful woman bound to a post. The merchant doesn't wish to intervene, but Verrus takes her along. She is mysterious, identifying herself only as Isthar, a name that may or may not be real.

The merchant is transporting gold, spices and other valuable commodities across the desert. When a band of refugees and a small child who might be the rumored messiah need sanctuary, Verrus agrees, even though King Herod's soldiers are likely to come after them. The merchant conspires behind Verrus's back, coaxing Isthar into distracting Fabius Quintus, a guard who has become infatuated with her beauty.

Isthar later is in need of help and pleads with Fabius, who spurns and injures her. No one else but the refugees will help her. Herod's soldiers attack, so Isthar gives up her own camels to the infant's mother, remaining behind. She, along with all the others, is killed, but the child is safe.

Cast
 Ruth Roman as The woman
 Akim Tamiroff as The merchant
 Otello Toso as Verrus
 Gianni Musy as Fabius (credited as Gianni Glori)
 Arnoldo Foà as The Chaldean
 Alan Furlan as Rais
 Nino Marchetti as Metullus

Reception
Harrison's Reports gave the picture a lukewarm review. They enjoyed the background story, as well as the action sequences, but felt the overall plot was routine. They gave good marks to Ruth Roman and Akim Tamiroff for their performances.

References

External links
 
 
 

1959 films
1959 drama films
Peplum films
English-language Italian films
Films directed by Steve Sekely
Films scored by Mario Nascimbene
Films set in the 1st century
Religious epic films
Sword and sandal films
1950s English-language films
1950s Italian films